Walcha Airport  is an airport located in Walcha, New South Wales, Australia.

See also
 List of airports in New South Wales

References

External links
 Aerodromes Civil Aviation Safety Authority

Airports in New South Wales